George Vickers (1801–1879) was a U.S. Senator from Maryland from 1868 to 1873.

Senator Vickers may also refer to:

Arnold M. Vickers (1908–1967), West Virginia State Senate
Evan Vickers (born 1954), Utah State Senate